El Hombre is the second studio album by dominican dembow artist El Alfa, released on November 2, 2018 by the independent label El Jefe Records. It contains 14 tracks of Dembow and Latin Trap and incorporates elements of dancehall, reggae, and hip-hop. It also includes remixes of the hits "Suave" and "Lo que yo diga". It features guest appearances from Cardi B, Anuel AA, Bryant Myers, Jon Z, Miky Woodz, Noriel, Plan B, Miky Woodz, Farruko, La Kikada, Mozart La Para & El Shick. The album was supported by the release of nine singles: "Mi Mami", "Pa Jamaica", "Con Silenciador", "Suave" (remix), "Sientate en ese deo", "Lo que yo diga" (remix), "Puñala de Carne" and "Uzi".

The lead single "Mi mami" featuring Cardi B, produced by Chael, become his first song to debut inside the US Hot Latin Songs at number 42. However, it receive backlash by critics and fans alike due to the musical structure. Many observed that the track should have been Dembow instead of dancehall.

El Hombre become his first album to debut inside the Top 10 of the US Billboard Top Latin Albums chart at number 7, and peaked at number 6 at the US Latin Rhythm Albums, selling over 2,000 in the first week. Following the success of the album, El Alfa won Best Urban Artist at the 35th annual Soberano Awards. To promote the album, El Alfa embarked on a US Tour titled El Animal Tour.

Track listing

References 

El Alfa albums
2018 albums